Nipawin Airport  is located  south of Nipawin, Saskatchewan, Canada.

See also 
 Nipawin Water Aerodrome
 List of airports in Saskatchewan

References

External links
Nipawin Municipal Airport on COPA's Places to Fly airport directory

Registered aerodromes in Saskatchewan
Nipawin No. 487, Saskatchewan